Out of Karma is a band formed in Leicester, UK. The group consists of Joseph Macwan on vocals and rhythm guitar, Chris Topham on lead guitar and backing vocals, Malcolm D’Sa on drums, Ameer Hosseinbucus on percussion and backing vocals, Suraj Kika on Bass, Katherine Friedmann on saxophone and keyboards and Pascal Pereira on Bass Guitars, Keyboards and arrangements.

Described as a blend of Indie Rock and Reggae, the band's first single "Hero" was well received and appeared on the "Brown Punk" record label created by Tricky of Massive Attack and Chris Blackwell of Palm Pictures/Island Records. Jazzie B of Soul II Soul said Joseph Macwan and Out of Karma created "Great new music".

In September 2017, Out of Karma released 'This Life' - a single and video single which is also the title track of an EP and album the band is working on due for release in mid 2018.

In May 2018, the band released a video single for 'Gunshot', a re-worked and re-released track from the 'This Life EP' (due for release in summer 2018). The video reflects current events in the war in Syria and was released in protest of the continual international bombing of the now war torn nation. Singer songwriter Joseph Macwan described the song as portraying "the vile nature of 'Gunshot' in all its manifestations, whether it be in the streets of Palestine, Syria, West Virginia, London, Compton, Kingston...". The band are releasing a video for every track on the EP to create a visual representation of the story that 'This Life' tells.

February 2020 saw the release of the bands next single "Crazy Times"

The band regularly play festivals including the Summer Sundae festival and the 2016 Simon Says festival, sharing the billing with headline act The Wonder Stuff.

External links
Out of Karma on Facebook
Video Single 'Crazy Times' on YouTube (February 2020)
Video Single 'Freedom' on YouTube (May 2020)
Video Single 'Bottle In The Smoke' (January 2019)
Video Single 'Gunshot' on YouTube (May 2018)
Video Single 'This Life' on YouTube (Aug 2017)
Studio and live recordings on Soundcloud
Official page on Reverb Nation
Official website

References

English indie rock groups
Musical groups from Leicester
Musical groups established in 2005
British reggae musical groups